Gregory Avery-Weir is an American game designer and writer, best known for the 2009 browser game The Majesty of Colors. Avery-Weir lives in Charlotte, North Carolina, United States.

Early life and education
Avery-Weir received little formal art training, other than occasional art and cartooning classes while growing up. At college they produced a weekly comic in their college newspaper called “The Absolute Sum of All Evil”.

Career
Up until 2008, Avery-Weir worked as a web developer for RealEstate.com.  Prior to their fully released games, Avery-Weir developed hobby game projects in Logowriter, Hypercard, DOS batch scripts, Megazeux, and Inform 6 and 7.

Avery-Weir wrote most of their games in the language ActionScript 3 for the Flash platform.  Avery-Weir takes responsibility for the graphics, the programming, and the design of the games. They funded their work through a bid-based model, where casual gaming portals such as Kongregate or Armor Games bid to sponsor Flash projects in exchange for privileges such as their logo appearing in the final game, site exclusivity, or other benefits.  Avery-Weir's games are developed start to finish, and then offered up for sponsorship as a complete product.  Says Avery-Weir, "That means that I get to maintain creative freedom, although it does introduce uncertainty. I’m never quite sure if a game is going to get sponsors interested at all."

Influences
Among the games that Avery-Weir has suggested influence their work is Shadow of the Colossus, Planescape: Torment and Knytt. They have also mentioned H. P. Lovecraft as an influence.

Writing
During 2008 and 2009, Avery-Weir undertook paid work writing for game website GameSetWatch. They also maintain a blog on games called Ludus Novus.

Games
 Necropolis
 The Majesty of Colors
 Babies Dream of Dead Worlds
 Bars of Black and White
 Exploit
 Sugarcore
 How to Raise a Dragon
 Silent Conversation
 The Mold Fairy
 The Bryant Collection
 Backup
 Looming
 The Day
 A Ride Home
 Beneath the Waves
 Passing the Ball
 "The Whispering Thing"
 FutureProof

See also
 Anna Anthropy

References

External links
Ludus Novus, Avery-Weir's blog, with playable versions of many of Avery-Weir's games
 

Living people
American video game designers
Writers from Charlotte, North Carolina
Place of birth missing (living people)
Year of birth missing (living people)